Bobby Vitale, also known as "Jerry Forde" (June 30, 1965 - August 29, 2017) was an American pornographic actor of Mexican/ Irish descent. He entered the adult film industry in 1995 and had performed in over 418 titles. His filmography included films directed by John Leslie. Vitale has directed two adult films.

Personal life
Vitale was married to fellow porn actor Nikki Tyler from 1996 to 1998. He appeared in scenes with her. They subsequently got divorced, and Vitale later became engaged to Briana Banks in 2003, before they split up in 2006.

Vitale was the victim of a car accident in 2004 that left him with a smashed pelvis, crushed urethra and having to use a wheelchair and a colostomy bag temporarily.

Having retired in the mid 2000s, Vitale ran a body shop in Southern California for several years. He claimed to be ready to make a comeback to the porn industry in 2011, but nothing ever came of this.

Awards
2000 XRCO Award – Male Performer of the Year
2001 AVN Award – Best Couples Sex Scene (Film) – Facade (with Sydnee Steele)

References

External links 
 
 
 

1965 births
2017 deaths
American male pornographic film actors
American people of Italian descent
Living people